Ramirez v. Collier, 595 U.S. ___ (2022), is a United States Supreme Court case related to the First Amendment to the United States Constitution and the Religious Land Use and Institutionalized Persons Act.

Background 
On July 19, 2004, 20-year-old John Henry Ramirez (June 29, 1984 – October 5, 2022), a former United States Marine, accompanied by two female acquaintances, murdered 46-year-old convenience store worker Pablo Castro outside a Times Market in Corpus Christi, Texas. Ramirez stabbed Castro a total of twenty-nine times, resulting in his death. The trio stole less than two dollars from Castro and fled the scene without entering the store. The two female acquaintances were captured a day later but Ramirez fled to Mexico and was not captured until 2008. He was convicted of murder and sentenced to death soon thereafter.

Ramirez was originally scheduled to be executed on September 9, 2020. That warrant was withdrawn. Years prior to this, he had been scheduled for execution on February 2, 2017, but his execution was stayed by the District Court.

In 2021, Ramirez filed suit to challenge the Texas execution protocol under the Religious Land Use and Institutionalized Persons Act and the Free Exercise Clause of the First Amendment to the United States Constitution, seeking to have his minister be allowed to lay hands on his body and audibly pray during the execution process. The district court and the United States Court of Appeals for the Fifth Circuit both denied stays of execution, the latter over the dissent of Judge James L. Dennis. Ramirez then filed a petition for a writ of certiorari.

Supreme Court decision 
The Supreme Court stayed Ramirez's execution shortly before it was scheduled to occur on September 8, 2021, and granted his petition for a writ of certiorari. Oral arguments were held on November 9, 2021.

On March 24, 2022, the Supreme Court ruled in favor of Ramirez, with Chief Justice John Roberts stating that Texas' denial of Ramirez's request "likely violated a federal law".

Execution 
On October 5, 2022, Ramirez was executed by lethal injection at the Huntsville Unit. Before his death, Ramirez's spiritual advisor Dana Moore said a prayer while his right hand was on Ramirez's chest.

See also 
 List of people executed in Texas, 2020–present
 List of people executed in the United States in 2022

References

External links 
 

2022 in United States case law
United States Supreme Court cases
United States Supreme Court cases of the Roberts Court
United States free exercise of religion case law